This is a list of Belgian football transfers for the 2011-12 winter transfer window. Only transfers involving a team from the Jupiler League are listed.

The winter transfer window opens on 1 January 2012, although a few transfers may take place prior to that date. The window closes at midnight on 1 February 2012. Players without a club may join one, either during or in between transfer windows.

Sorted by date

November 2011

December 2011

End of 2011
Some players were on a loan which ended in 2011. As of 1 January 2012, they returned to their original club and are listed here. For a list of players on loan during the last year, see List of Belgian football transfers winter 2010–11 and summer 2011.

January 2012

February 2012

Sorted by team

Anderlecht

In:

Out:

Beerschot

In:

Out:

Cercle Brugge

In:

Out:

Club Brugge

In:

Out:

Genk
Note: midfielder  Kevin De Bruyne signed for  Chelsea, but will stay on loan for the remainder of the season.

In:

Out:

Gent

In:

Out:

Kortrijk

In:

Out:

Lierse

In:

Out:

Lokeren

In:

Out:

Mechelen

In:

Out:

Mons

In:

Out:

OH Leuven

In:

Out:

Sint-Truiden

In:

Out:

Standard Liège

In:

Out:

Westerlo

In:

Out:

Zulte Waregem

In:

Out:

Footnotes

References

Belgian
Transfers Winter
2011 Winter